On 6 April 2011, a boat carrying migrants from Libya to Italy sank  south of Lampedusa and  southwest of Malta. An emergency response involving the Italian Coast Guard resulted in the rescue of an initial 48 survivors and the retrieval of 20 bodies. A fishing boat picked up an additional three survivors. At least a further 130 people were not found after the shipwreck.

Incident
The boat left from Zuwara in northwestern Libya on 4 April, amongst the first to leave the country after the unrest began in March. According to the International Organization for Migration, the capsized boat was believed to be carrying up to 300 North Africans and other migrants, mainly from Bangladesh, Chad, the Ivory Coast, Nigeria, Somalia and Sudan. Among them were five children and forty women, of whom only two survived. A Coast Guard spokesman indicated that the sinking was probably the result of high seas caused by strong winds and that the initial rescue effort was hampered by darkness and bad weather. Italian naval and air force assets were involved in locating the missing passengers, along with an aircraft from the Armed Forces of Malta. Five further people were located and rescued.

Reaction
A United Nations High Commission for Refugees spokeswoman suggested that improved coordination was required in the identification of people migrating from Africa to Europe. Italian Prime Minister Silvio Berlusconi expressed "deep sorrow" at the loss of life.

See also

 May 2007 Malta migrant shipwreck
 2009 Mediterranean Sea migrant shipwreck
 2013 Mediterranean Sea migrant shipwreck

References

External links
 Boats 4 People, project which aims at denouncing Mediterranean state authorities for their responsibility in migrants' shipwrecks

Migrant shipwreck
Migrant shipwreck
Migrant shipwreck
Maritime incidents in Libya
Transport disasters involving refugees of the Arab Winter (2011–present)
Lampedusa e Linosa